Teucrium junceum is a species of flowering plant in the family Lamiaceae, and is endemic to eastern Australia. It is a scrambling, openly-branched shrub, with small leaves, white flowers and orange to red fruit.

Description
Flowering mainly occurs in summer and the fruit is an orange to red drupe  in diameter.

Taxonomy
This germander was first formally described in 1847 by Allan Cunningham in Wilhelm Gerhard Walpers' Repertorium Botanices Systematicae, and was given the name Spartothamnus junceus. In 2016, Stefan Kattari and Günther Heubl changed the name to Teucrium junceum in the journal Taxon.

Distribution and habitat
Teucrium junceum grows in dry forest, including dry rainforest. It is widespread in eastern Queensland, south from near Mount Surprise to near Camden in New South Wales.

Conservation status
Teucrium junceum is listed as of "least concern" under the Queensland Government Nature Conservation Act 1992.

References

junceum
Lamiales of Australia
Flora of New South Wales
Flora of Queensland
Plants described in 1883
Taxa named by Wilhelm Gerhard Walpers
Taxa named by Allan Cunningham (botanist)